Flavio Cipolla and Alessio di Mauro were the defending champions but Cipolla decided not to participate.
Di Mauro partnered Enrico Burzi, however Francesco Aldi and Marco Cecchinato defeated them in the quarterfinals.

Stefano Ianni and Luca Vanni won the title, defeating Martin Fischer and Alessandro Motti 6–4, 1–6, [11–9] in the final.

Seeds
Top seeds received a bye into the quarterfinals.

Draw

Draw

References
 Main Draw

Blu-express.com Tennis Cup - Doubles
Internazionali di Tennis Città dell'Aquila